Xanthoconium montaltoense is a species of bolete fungus in the genus Xanthoconium. Described as new to science in 1987, it is found in Pennsylvania, where it grows on soil under Betula lenta and Tsuga canadensis. The specific epithet montaltoense refers to Mont Alto campus of Pennsylvania State University, close to the type locality.

See also
List of North American boletes

References

External links

Boletaceae
Fungi described in 1987
Fungi of the United States
Fungi without expected TNC conservation status